Eskapo is a 1995 Filipino historical thriller film directed by Chito S. Roño and written by Roy Iglesias and Jose Lacaba. It stars Christopher de Leon and Richard Gomez as Eugenio "Geny" Lopez Jr. and Sergio "Serge" Osmeña III respectively, along with Dina Bonnevie, Ricky Davao, Mark Anthony Fernandez, Eric Fructuoso, and Romeo Rivera. The film was released by Star Cinema on January 25, 1995.

Plot
In 1972, after martial law was imposed in the Philippines through Proclamation No. 1081, Geny Lopez and Serge Osmeña are separately arrested based on false accusations of attempts to assassinate President Ferdinand Marcos. Eventually, Lopez and Osmeña would hatch a plan together to escape from Fort Bonifacio and discreetly travel abroad, out of range from Marcos' dictatorial grasp.

Cast
Christopher de Leon as Eugenio "Geny" Lopez Jr.
Richard Gomez as Sergio "Serge" Osmeña III
Dina Bonnevie as Chita Lopez
Ricky Davao as Atty. Jake Almeda-Lopez
Armando Goyena as Eugenio Lopez Sr.
Mark Anthony Fernandez as Eugenio "Gabby" Lopez III
Eric Fructuoso as Raffy Lopez
Farrah Florer as Marissa Lopez
Paula Peralejo as Gina Lopez
T.J. Cruz as Ernie Lopez
Camille Prats as Roberta Lopez
Carlo Prats as Ramón Lopez
Maila Gumila as Minnie Osmeña-Cabarrus
Amado Cortez as Sergio Osmeña, Jr.
Teresa Loyzaga as Imelda Marcos
Romeo Rivera as Popoy
Miguel Faustmann as Steve Psinakis
Augusto Victa as Prima
Ramon Recto as Jimmy Jimenea
Pocholo Montes as Evaristo Zulueta
Ray Ventura as The General
Joel Torre as Jorge Cabardo
Mark Gil as Jesús "Jess" Cabarrus Jr.
Nestor Escano as Lorenzo Tañada

Notes

1.  The character is based on then-Leyte governor Kokoy Romualdez. According to Raul Rodrigo's book Kapitan: Geny Lopez and the Making of ABS-CBN, Romualdez was sent to the United States by the Marcos regime as an emissary to Serging Osmeña and Don Eugenio Lopez to secure their cooperation and endorsement of the New Society in exchange for their sons' release from prison.

Production

Accolades

References

External links

Star Cinema official site

1995 films
1990s historical films
1990s thriller drama films
ABS-CBN
Cultural depictions of Filipino men
Films about miscarriage of justice
Films about prison escapes
Films directed by Chito S. Roño
Films set in 1972
Films set in 1973
Films set in 1974
Films set in 1976
Films set in 1977
Films set in Metro Manila
Films set in the Philippines
Films set in prison
Philippine films based on actual events
Presidency of Ferdinand Marcos
Star Cinema drama films
Star Cinema films
Tagalog-language films
1995 drama films